Glipa sauteri is a species of beetle in the genus Glipa. It was described in 1911.

References

sauteri
Beetles described in 1911